35022 Holland America Line was one of the last batch of ten SR Merchant Navy class steam locomotives to be built, although a Southern Railway design it was built by British Railways.

Completed at Eastleigh Works in October 1948, Holland America Line was first shedded at Exmouth Junction until June 1954, when it was transferred to Bournemouth. Other shed allocations included Weymouth Radipole and Nine Elms. 35022 was withdrawn from service in May 1966 after a working life of just 17 years, and was sold to Woodham Brothers scrapyard in Barry, South Wales.

Preservation
In 1983, it was purchased by "The Southern Steam Trust" for preservation and was moved to Swanage where a restoration to running order was to take place; however, restoration was never started and as of 2018, it is now owned by "Royal Scot Locomotive and General Trust" and is stored at Crewe awaiting restoration to mainline condition.

4-6-2 locomotives
Railway locomotives introduced in 1948
Merchant Navy 35022 Holland America Line
Standard gauge steam locomotives of Great Britain
Streamlined steam locomotives
Locomotives saved from Woodham Brothers scrapyard